The Cameroon General Certificate of Education (GCE) Board is the official body in charge of organizing end-of-year examinations for candidates writing the GCE O and A Levels. The Main Office is located in Buea, Southwest Region (Cameroon), and the Current Registrar Dang Akuh Dominic. The Cameroon GCE board was established in 1993 as a public examination body supervised by Cameroon ministry of secondary education in Yaoundé.

The following examinations are organized by the GCE Board as of 4 March 2019:
 The General Certificate of Education Examination Ordinary Level
 The General Certificate of Education Examination Advanced Level
 The Technical and Vocational Education Examination Intermediate Level
 The Technical and Vocational Education Examination Advanced, and the Professional Certificate Examination

Overview 
The General Certificate of Education is a pure UK system of education adopted by Anglo-Saxon Cameroon.

In Cameroon, the GCE Ordinary Level examination is a 3-year course program starting from Form 3 to Form 5 (Years 9 to 11). It is usually written in Form 5 (Year 11) in Secondary schools, meanwhile the GCE Advanced Level examinations are written in Upper 6 (Year 13) in High school.

Creation 

By a Presidential Decree of March 1997, the GCE Board was authorized to organize the Baccalauréat Technique and related examinations in English for English speaking candidates. Although the names of these examinations were in French, questions were in English and candidates answered them in English, which was their language of instruction.

Chairman 
The new GCE Board chairman, Prof Ivo Leke Tambo is the former Secretary-General at the Ministry of Basic Education. He had earlier served at the Ministry of Secondary Education in the same capacity. He took up the position from the Former Minister for Special Duties at the Presidency, Prof Peter Alange ABETY.

Registrar 
The current Registrar is Dang Akuh Dominic, who took up the position on 31 January 2018 from Monono Ekema Humprey.

Supervisor 
It is supervised by Nalova Lyonga, Cameroon Ministry of Secondary Education in Yaoundé,

Statistics 
In 2018, Statistics from the GCE Board showed that there was a 67.4% passed at the Advanced Level as against 35% in 2017. At the Ordinary Level,  50% passed compared to 25.29% in 2017.

In 2020, Statistics from the GCE Board show that at the Ordinary levels, results have witnessed improvement from 62.15 to 64.04% while at the advanced level, the result however dropped from 74.24% in 2019 to 64. 4% in 2020.

Offices 
The head Office is situated at Molyko Street, 3.0 km from Mile 17 Motor Park, Opposite Molyko police, Buea.

The Regional Office is located in Bamenda, North West Region, Cameroon.

Official Website 
The official website of the Cameroon GCE Board is camgceb.org/

Organizational Chart 
Decree 2019/100 of 4 March 2019 to modify and complete certain provisions of Decree 2018/614 of 22 October 2018 to reorganize the General Certificate of Education (GCE) Board.

They have now been replaced by the following examinations:

 Intermediate Technical and Vocational Education (ITC).
 Advanced Technical and Vocational Education (ATC).
 Professional Certification Examination (APC).

The GCE ITC and ATC are written for the first time and has come to replace the CAP/OL Technical and BACC/AL Technical respectively.

Management of the Board 

 The Board of Directors
 The Registrar

The Registrar is the Chief Executive Officer of the Board. In that capacity, he represents the Board in all academic matters. He is also the chairman of the Examinations Executive Committee (EEC).

The EEC is responsible for all academic matters of the Board. It is also responsible for the organization, quality control, and development of the Boards Examinations.

Grading system 
Letter grades are used and below is the grading system used by the Cameroon GCE board for the examinations it administers:
 GCE O Level Grading scale: A, B, C and u
Letter grades A, B, and C represent a passing grade, with the A grade being the highest and the C grade being the lowest, and U (unclassified) representing a fail. Grades lower than C are not stated on the certificate.
 GCE A Level Grading scale: A, B, C, D, E, O, or F

Ordinary Level General Grading 
Attainment is indicated by the Grades A to E of Which Grade A is the highest and Grade E the lowest. A candidate with Grades A, B, or C has reached the standard of subject pass at the Ordinary Level. Grades D and E indicate a lower level of attainment, not representing a pass. Grade E being the lowest level of attainment judged by the Board to be of sufficient standard to be recorded. Performance below the standard Grade E will be unclassified and will not be indicated on the certificate.

Advanced Level General Grading 
Attainment is indicated by the Grades A to E of Which Grade A is the highest and Grade E the lowest. A candidate with Grades A, B, C, D or E has reached the standard of subject pass at the Advanced Level. Grades F indicate a lower level of attainment, not representing a pass. Grade F being the lowest level of attainment judged by the Board to be of sufficient standard to be recorded. Performance below the standard Grade F will be unclassified and will not be indicated on the certificate.

Timetable 
The decision No 787/19 of MINESEC/SEESEN/ SG/DECC/SDOEC of 28 October 2019 signed by the Minister of Secondary Education, Nalova Lyonga, sets the timetables for official or end-of-course examinations, when they will be written, marked and deliberated upon as well as deadlines for the publication of results.

See also 
 West African Examinations Council

References

External links
 https://camgceb.org/

School qualifications
Secondary school qualifications
Organizations established in 1993
1993 establishments in Cameroon